Elgin Baylor Lumpkin (born October 15, 1970), better known by his stage name  Ginuwine, is an American R&B singer, songwriter, dancer, and actor. He began his career as a member of Swing Mob in the early 1990s. Signing to Epic Records as a solo artist in the mid-1990s, Ginuwine has released a number of multi-platinum and platinum-selling albums and singles, becoming one of R&B's top artists during the late 1990s and early 2000s.  He had significant commercial success with his first four albums: Ginuwine...The Bachelor (2× Platinum), 100% Ginuwine (2× Platinum), The Life (Platinum), and The Senior (Gold). According to Billboard, Ginuwine has sold roughly 10 million albums in the US. Ginuwine received the Urban Music Icon award at the 2021 Black Music Honors.

Early life 
Elgin Baylor Lumpkin was born on October 15, 1970 in Washington, D.C. He is named after NBA legend Elgin Baylor, a fellow D.C. native.  In 1988, he graduated from Forestville High School (now known as Forestville Military Academy) in Forestville, Maryland, and later graduated from Prince George's Community College in Largo, Maryland, with a paralegal associate's degree.

Career

Music 

Ginuwine began his career as a member of Swing Mob, a Rochester, New York-based record label and music compound founded by Donald "DeVante Swing" DeGrate, a member of popular 90's R&B group Jodeci. There, he met rapper Melissa "Missy" Elliott, singer-songwriter Stephen "Static Major" Garrett and producer Timothy "Timbaland" Mosley, who became his main collaborators through the 1990s. After Swing Mob folded, they continued working together on different projects, one of which was Ginuwine's 1996 debut album, titled Ginuwine...The Bachelor.  The first single, "Pony" showcased his smooth vocals and Timbaland's innovative production style, and also Static Major's writing skills; the two became a hit-making duo. "Pony" peaked at number 6 on the Billboard Hot 100. It is still relevant today with the smooth upbeat tempos. 

His second album, 100% Ginuwine, was released in 1999 and featured the hit singles "Same Ol' G, "So Anxious" and "None of Ur Friends Business".  After 100% Ginuwine, Ginuwine and Timbaland grew apart.  Producers such as R. Kelly have crafted hits for him since then. In 2001, Ginuwine had a number-four hit on the Billboard Hot 100 with the single "Differences", which also peaked at number one on the Billboard Hot R&B/Hip-Hop Songs chart.

Within a year, Ginuwine lost both of his parents. He later wrote and recorded a song that is featured on his third album The Life entitled "Two Reasons I Cry". In 2002, he was a featured artist on P. Diddy's number-one hit "I Need a Girl (Part II)". Later that year, Ginuwine started his own label, Bag Entertainment. The label would feature artists such as Jose Cenquentez (who appeared on The Senior) and Knight.

Ginuwine's fifth album, Back II Da Basics, was released on November 15, 2005. The album debuted at number 12 on the Billboard 200, selling close to 100,000 copies. Ginuwine stated on BET's Top 100 countdown that the album went Gold with sales of 500,000 copies.

In May 2007, an album entitled I Apologize was released in stores. Although attributed to Ginuwine, the release was an unauthorized album and included only three Ginuwine songs – apparently from stolen masters – and ten songs by other artists. Ginuwine spoke against the unofficial release on both his MySpace page and through YouTube. In 2007, Ginuwine collaborated with Canadian hip-hop artist Belly in the latter's debut solo song "Pressure", which was featured in Belly's debut album the Revolution, released in June 2007.

Ginuwine's sixth album entitled A Man's Thoughts, was released on June 23, 2009. The album was produced by The Underdogs, B Cox, Timbaland, The Runners, Johnta Austin, Oak and Polow Da Don. The album includes guests appearances from Brandy, Missy Elliott, Bun B and Timbaland. Ginuwine formed a group with Tank and Tyrese named TGT. Their first single was a remix of Tank's "Please Don't Go". They were supposed to tour but plans fell apart due to conflicting schedules.

Ginuwine announced on his Myspace Blog on August 21, 2008, that due to label and legal issues, they will not be able to release an official TGT album. Ginuwine is the founder and CEO of LoveSong Incorporated, after completing his contract with 550 Music/Epic. Ginuwine announced on his Myspace blog on August 21, 2008, that he signed a major label deal with Notifi Records/Warner Brothers.

Ginuwine introduced producer MELROG and rapper Young Knight a.k.a. Knightron on the Back 2 Da Basics album. Currently Knightron is working on his own album under Ginuwine's label BAG ENT. Ginuwine's seventh studio album, Elgin, was released on Valentine's Day in 2011.

Ginuwine is currently working on his eighth studio album Same Ol' G...the Bachelor and confirmed that Timbaland and Missy Elliott executive produced the project.

TGT 

In 2007, Ginuwine teamed up with Tyrese, and Tank and formed an R&B group among themselves called TGT and have signed to Atlantic Records in 2012. Their Grammy-nominated debut album Three Kings was released in 2013. The first single of the album "Sex Never Felt Better" was released on iTunes on February 14, 2013, for Valentine's Day.

Film 
Ginuwine was originally cast in the 2004 film You Got Served. Ultimately R&B artist Marques Houston was cast in his place. The writer of the movie kept Ginuwine's real name "Elgin" as the name for one of the lead characters. He also was cast as R&B singer "Romeo" in the film Juwanna Mann. He also appeared in three episodes of Moesha as Khalib, called "All This and Turkey, Too", "You Say He's Just A Friend", and "On the Rebound"

Ginuwine appeared on Half & Half as R.J. Jackson in the episode "The Big Don't Go Chasing Waterfalls Episode" that aired in 2004.

In February 2011, Ginuwine co-starred in the Gospel Music Channel's debut of John Ruffin's stage play The Ideal Husband, which also stars Darrin Dewitt Henson, Jackée Harry, Clifton Powell, Shirley Murdock, Shanti Lowry and Erica Hubbard.

Endorsements 
Ginuwine is a spokesman for the beverage Adult Chocolate Milk, a 40-proof vodka-based version of chocolate milk.

Television 
Ginuwine appeared in the CBS show Martial Law starring Sammo Hung and Arsenio Hall. In the episode "How Sammo Got His Groove Back" airing November 21, 1998, Ginuwine plays Hall's nephew, Zeke Meadows, a singer who is a target for murder by a ruthless CD bootlegger.

Ginuwine appeared on the UPN television sitcom Half & Half where he played R.J. Jackson, the friend of Spencer's (Chico Benymon) which aired in November 2004.

In the NBC series Parks and Recreation, character Donna Meagle is Ginuwine's cousin. He appeared on the show as himself twice: the season six finale "Moving Up," (performing at the Unity Concert) and the seventh-season episode "Donna & Joe."

On January 5, 2018, Ginuwine entered the UK reality show Celebrity Big Brother 21. He was evicted on January 23, 2018, and came in 11th place.

Personal life 
Ginuwine lost both his parents; his father died by suicide, and his mother to cancer less than a year later. Ginuwine struggled with grief and depression; he also thought of taking his own life. He received counseling from his pastor, which turned him to a more positive path. He recorded the song "Two Reasons I Cry" about the death of his parents on his 2001 album The Life.

Ginuwine was married to the rapper Tonya M. Johnston better known by her stage name, Solé. Ginuwine met Solé in June 1999 and they began dating in October 1999. They were married on September 8, 2003, in the Cayman Islands. They lived in Maryland.  They have two daughters together: Story (born March 29, 2001) and Dream Sarae Lumpkin (born November 1, 2002). He has a son Elgin, Jr (born January 30, 1991) from a previous relationship, as well as four other children with three different women. In February 2009, Ginuwine announced he has nine children: Ramonda, Tiffany, Elgin, Ginel, Tahjair, Story and Dream, plus two step-children, Dejan and Cypress.

In November 2014, he announced he and Solé had separated. Their divorce was finalized July 22, 2015.

Discography 

Studio albums
 Ginuwine...the Bachelor (1996)
 100% Ginuwine (1999)
 The Life (2001)
 The Senior (2003)
 Back II da Basics (2005)
 A Man's Thoughts (2009)
 Elgin (2011)

Collaborative albums
 Three Kings  (2013)

Filmography

Film

Television

Awards and nominations 
Grammy Awards
 2014, Best R&B Album: "Three Kings" (Nominated)
BET Awards
2003: Best Male R&B Artist, Nominated
American Music Awards
2003: Favorite Male R&B Artist, Nominated
2002: Favorite Male R&B Artist, Nominated
2000: Favorite Male R&B Artist, Nominated
Soul Train Music Awards
2000: Best R&B/Soul Male Single ("So Anxious"), Nominated
2000: Best R&B/Soul Male Album (100% Ginuwine), Winner

References

External links 

1970 births
550 Music artists
African-American male singer-songwriters
American hip hop singers
20th-century African-American male singers
American soul singers
Asylum Records artists
Epic Records artists
Living people
Swing Mob artists
American contemporary R&B singers
21st-century African-American male singers
TGT (group) members
Singer-songwriters from Washington, D.C.